Jules Souleymane Keita (born 4 November 1987) is a Senegalese footballer.

Honours
ACS Poli Timișoara
Romanian Second League: 2014–15

External links
 
 

1989 births
Living people
Footballers from Dakar
Senegalese footballers
Senegalese expatriate footballers
Association football midfielders
AS Marsa players
FC Botoșani players
Liga I players
Liga II players
ACF Gloria Bistrița players
FC Politehnica Iași (2010) players
ACS Poli Timișoara players
CS Național Sebiș players
CSM Reșița players
Expatriate footballers in Tunisia
Senegalese expatriate sportspeople in Tunisia
Expatriate footballers in Romania
Senegalese expatriate sportspeople in Romania